Howard County is located in the U.S. state of Missouri, with its southern border formed by the Missouri River. As of the 2020 census, the population was 10,151. Its county seat is Fayette. The county was organized January 23, 1816, and named for Benjamin Howard, the first Governor of the Missouri Territory. Settled originally by migrants from the Upper South, it is part of the region historically known as Little Dixie. It is part of the Columbia, Missouri, metropolitan area.

History
Located on the north bank of the Missouri River, Howard County was settled primarily from the Upper Southern states of Kentucky, Tennessee and Virginia. The migrants brought slaves and slaveholding traditions with them, and cultivated hemp and tobacco, crops of Middle Tennessee. Howard was one of several counties settled mainly by Southerners along the Missouri River in the center of the state. Because of this, this area became known as Little Dixie, and Howard County was at its heart. Following the 1848 revolutions in the German nations, many German immigrants also came to this region, developing farms.

Due to the reliance on slave labor, by 1860 African-American slaves composed at least 25 percent of the county's population. Given their backgrounds and cultural affiliations, many Howard County residents supported the Confederacy during the Civil War. Ethnic German immigrants and descendants tended to support the Union.

After the end of Reconstruction, whites enforced Jim Crow laws and racial segregation in the county to maintain white supremacy. In the most violent period, at the turn of the 20th century, five African Americans were lynched in Howard County from 1891 to 1914: Olli Truxton, Frank Embree, Thomas Hayden, Arthur McNeal, and Dallas Shields. Howard County tied with Pike County for the highest rate of lynchings in the state.

The county continued to be developed for agriculture and is still largely rural. However, Howard County has lost population since its peak in 1880. The mechanization of farming reduced the demand for labor, and many workers left for jobs in the cities and less oppressive societies. By 2000 African Americans in the county had declined to less than seven percent of the total. In the early 21st century, nearly one-third of the residents identify as being of German ancestry, reflecting the wave of mid-19th century immigration.

Geography

Adjacent counties
Chariton County (northwest)
Randolph County (northeast)
Boone County (southeast)
Cooper County (south)
Saline County (west)

Major highways
 U.S. Route 40
 Route 3
 Route 5
 Route 87
 Route 124
 Route 240 
 Route 240 Alternate
 Route 240 Business
 Route 240 Spur

National protected area
Big Muddy National Fish and Wildlife Refuge (part)

Demographics

As of the census of 2000, there were 10,212 people, 3,836 households, and 2,631 families residing in the county.  The population density was 22 people per square mile (8/km2).  There were 4,346 housing units at an average density of 9 per square mile (4/km2).  The racial makeup of the county was 91.13% White, 6.84% Black or African American, 0.33% Native American, 0.12% Asian, 0.08% Pacific Islander, 0.40% from other races, and 1.10% from two or more races. Approximately 0.86% of the population were Hispanic or Latino of any race. 32.4% were of German, 16.1% American, 8.9% English and 8.3% Irish ancestry.

There were 3,836 households, out of which 31.50% had children under the age of 18 living with them, 55.30% were married couples living together, 9.50% had a female householder with no husband present, and 31.40% were non-families. 27.30% of all households were made up of individuals, and 13.30% had someone living alone who was 65 years of age or older.  The average household size was 2.46 and the average family size was 2.98.

In the county, the population was spread out, with 24.00% under the age of 18, 13.30% from 18 to 24, 25.20% from 25 to 44, 21.30% from 45 to 64, and 16.10% who were 65 years of age or older.  The median age was 37 years. For every 100 females, there were 94.00 males.  For every 100 females age 18 and over, there were 94.40 males.

The median income for a household in the county was $31,614, and the median income for a family was $40,167. Males had a median income of $26,369 versus $19,950 for females. The per capita income for the county was $15,198.  About 7.50% of families and 11.60% of the population were below the poverty line, including 14.70% of those under age 18 and 14.40% of those age 65 or over.

2020 Census

Education

Public schools
Fayette R-III School District – Fayette
Laurence J. Daly Elementary School (PK-05)
William N. Clark Middle School (06-08)
Fayette High School (09-12)
Glasgow School District – Glasgow
Howard County Elementary School (PK-06)
Glasgow High School (07-12)
New Franklin R-I School District – New Franklin
New Franklin Elementary School (PK-05)
New Franklin Middle/High School (06-12)

Private schools
St. Mary's Catholic School – Glasgow (K-08) – Roman Catholic
Grace & Glory Christian Academy – New Franklin (K-12) – Baptist - [Closed]

Post-secondary
Central Methodist University – Fayette – A private, four-year Methodist university.

Public libraries
Howard County Library  
Lewis Library of Glasgow

Politics

Local
The Democratic Party predominantly controls politics at the local level in Howard County. Democrats hold all but four of the elected positions in the county.

State

Howard County is split between two districts of the Missouri House of Representatives, both of which are represented by Republicans.
District 47 — Chuck Basye consists of the eastern part of the county.

District 48 — Dave Muntzel consists of the central and western parts of the county.

All of Howard County is a part of Missouri's 21st District in the Missouri Senate and is currently represented by Denny Hoskins (R-Warrensburg).

Federal

All of Howard County is included in Missouri's 4th Congressional District and is currently represented by Vicky Hartzler (R-Harrisonville) in the U.S. House of Representatives.

Missouri presidential preference primary (2008)

Former U.S. Senator Hillary Clinton (D-New York) received more votes, a total of 685, than any candidate from either party in Howard County during the 2008 presidential primary.

Communities

Cities and Towns

Armstrong
Fayette (county seat)
Franklin
Glasgow
New Franklin

Unincorporated Communities

 Boonesboro
 Bunker Hill
 Burton
 Estill
 Hilldale
 Lisbon
 Roanoke
 Sebree
 Steinmetz

Notable people
 Frank P. Briggs - former United States Senator and Assistant U.S. Secretary of the Interior.
 Sara Evans - American country music singer.
 Spottswood Rice - Union Soldier in the Civil War and African Methodist Episcopal Church minister.
 Talbot Smith, United States District Judge
 Kit Carson - Trapper and guide for John Charles Fremont
 Caius T. Ryland - Speaker of the California State Assembly

See also
National Register of Historic Places listings in Howard County, Missouri

References

Further reading
 History of Howard and Chariton Counties, Missouri (1883) full text

External links
 Digitized 1930 Plat Book of Howard County  from University of Missouri Division of Special Collections, Archives, and Rare Books

 
1816 establishments in Missouri Territory
Populated places established in 1816
Little Dixie (Missouri)
Columbia metropolitan area (Missouri)
Missouri counties on the Missouri River